is a city located in Okinawa Prefecture, Japan. The city occupies the southern tip of Okinawa Island. As of April 2013, the city has an estimated population of 59,605 and a population density of 1,335.53 persons per km². The total area is 46.63 km².

Geography
Itoman sits on a flat tableland with craggy rolling hills of Ryukyuan limestone which range between Cape Kyan to the south and the sugar cane fields in front of Yozadake to the north. The south of the town is known for its steep sea cliffs around Cape Kyan and the Mabuni Cliffs.

History
Itoman has a long history as a fishing port. In the pre-modern period its fisherman ventured as far as the Indian Ocean. Records indicate that the fisherman made contact with Australia and New Guinea. By 1908 the village of Itoman numbered 8,000 residents, almost all involved in the fishing industry. Men of Itoman worked on fishing boats, and women worked at the transport and sale of fish in the prefectural capitol of Naha. In 1918 Naha and Itoman were connected by a horse-drawn tram. The line spanned . The Okinawa Prefectural Railways Itoman Line was established in 1924, and operated until 1945.

Itoman was a final front of the Battle of Okinawa in World War II. The area saw enormous casualties to both military forces and civilians. Itoman is noted for the Himeyuri Butai, a field hospital nursing corps of 221 high-school students who committed suicide at the end of the battle.

Administrative history
Itoman was established as a town in 1908. In 1961 it absorbed the villages of Kanegusuku, Takamine, and Miwa. Itoman was elevated to city status on December 1, 1971.

Government
Itoman is administered from the city hall in Shiozaki. The Itoman Board of Education oversees the preschool, elementary, and middle school, community education centers, and sports facilities of the city. The Itoman City Council consists of 23 members who serve a four-year term, and are led by a chairperson (Isao Uehara) and vice-chairperson (Isao Tokuzato) of the council.

Economy
Fishing remains the primary industry of the city of Itoman.

Transportation

Roads
Japan National Route 331, which connects Itoman and Ōgimi along the eastern coast of Okinawa Island, runs through Itoman and connects the city to other municipalities in Okinawa.

See also
 Cornerstone of Peace

References

External links

 Itoman City official website 
 Itoman City official website 
 News of Okinawa in WEB RADIO 
 Okinawa Prefectural Peace Memorial Museum
 Himeyuri Monument（Monument for high school girls who died in WWII）
 Cornerstone of Peace
 Mabuni Hill

 
Cities in Okinawa Prefecture
Populated coastal places in Japan